Roja Malare is a 1997 Indian Tamil-language romantic drama film directed by T. M. Jayamurugan. The film stars Murali, Reeva, Arun Pandian and Anand Babu. It was released on 5 December 1997.

Plot

Kannan is a singer in a musical ensemble with his friends. Kannan falls in love with, a college student, Malarvizhi but he cannot express his love. Malarvizhi gets engaged with Arun, a strict businessman. Will Malarvizhi accept Kannan's love forms the rest of the story.

Cast
Murali as Kannan
Reeva as Malarvizhi 
Arun Pandian as Arun
Anand Babu as Anbu
Senthil as Babu
Madhan Bob 
Sathyapriya as Lakshmi
Kottai Perumal
Shobaraj 
T. M. Jayamurugan

Production
Songs from the film was shot at St. Mary's Islands.

Soundtrack

The film score and the soundtrack were composed by Adithyan. The soundtrack, released in 1997, features 7 tracks with lyrics written by T. M. Jayamurugan. "Azhagoviyam" was one of the popular song from this film.

References

1997 films
1990s Tamil-language films